The Headies 2015 was the 10th edition of The Headies. It was held on January 1, 2016, at the Landmark Events Centre in Victoria Island, Lagos. Themed "Flip the Script", the event was hosted by Bovi and Kaffy. It was previously scheduled to hold on December 30, 2015, but the organizers of the event postponed it to January 1, 2016 without citing any reason. Olamide won a total of four awards, while Timi Dakolo won three. Wizkid was nominated seven times across the twenty-one award categories. 2face Idibia was honored with the Hall of Fame award, while Don Jazzy received the Special Recognition award. Reekado Banks won the Next Rated award. His win was criticized by music critics, who challenged the "fairness of the award process".

Performers 
Majek Fashek
Timi Dakolo
Olamide
Falz
Adekunle Gold
Simi
Harrysong
Seyi Shay
Victoria Kimani
Eva Alordiah
Vector
Iyanya

Winners and nominees
Below is the list of nominees and winners for the popular music categories. Winners are highlighted in bold.

References

2015 music awards
2015 in Nigerian music
The Headies